Live and Obscure is a live album released by folk/country singer-songwriter Townes Van Zandt in 1987. It was recorded at Twelfth and Porter in Nashville, Tennessee in April 1985.

Recording
Although Van Zandt had always been known primarily as a solo performer, by the mid-1980s he had expanded his touring band with the addition of Leland Waddell on drums, his brother David on bass, and Boston transplant Donny Silverman on saxophone and flute.  The group was rounded out by Van Zandt's longtime guitarist Mickey White, who recalled to Van Zandt biographer John Kruth in 2007, "Unfortunately the rehearsals just turned into big drunken orgies with everybody arguing all the time.  We'd just get drunk and wind up screaming at each other.  If we'd been sober, we woulda been a great band."  The band gigged around Texas mostly, but Van Zandt eventually realized that hauling a full band around with him was a logistical nightmare, and by the time his manager Harold Eggers booked the show at Twelfth and Porter in Nashville, the Waddell rhythm section had been abandoned.  

According to the book To Live's To Fly: The Ballad of the Late, Great Townes Van Zandt, the show was well hyped, with Guy Clark, Rodney Crowell, Rosanne Cash, and Neil Young attending to see Van Zandt perform, although the book quotes White as saying, "I didn't like the way it was recorded and tried to talk Townes out of releasing it."  In his 2018 memoir My Years with Townes Van Zandt: Music, Genius, and Rage, road manager and business partner Harold Eggers takes credit for suggesting the idea of recording the show at the 12th and Porter show and getting leading music writer Robert K. Oermann to write an article in The Tennessean titled "Poet Laureate of Texas' Rambles into Music City" to hype the concert.  Eggers writes:

Reception
AllMusic praises Live and Obscure, noting that "The rambling Texas troubadour did not disappoint his fans, peers, and colleagues that night...In this intimate setting, Van Zandt's aw-shucks charm comes through not just his songs, but his in-between banter."

Track listing 
All songs written by Townes Van Zandt
 "Dollar Bill Blues" – 2:40
 "Many a Fine Lady" – 3:51
 "Nothin' " – 3:23
 "Pueblo Waltz" – 2:24
 "Talking Thunderbird Blues" – 2:09
 "Rex's Blues" – 2:19
 "White Freightliner Blues" – 3:12
 "Loretta" – 3:31
 "Snake Mountain Blues" – 2:53
 "Waiting Around to Die" – 2:54
 "Tecumseh Valley" – 4:28
 "Pancho and Lefty" – 4:19
 "You Are Not Needed Now" – 4:41

Personnel
Townes Van Zandt – vocals, guitar
Donny Silverman – flute, saxophone
Mickey White – guitar

Production notes
Produced by Stephen J. Mendell and Townes Van Zandt
Harold F. Eggers, Jr. – executive producer
James Loyd – mastering
Robert K. Oermann – liner notes
Alan Mayor – photography
G. Brook Sefton – design

Townes Van Zandt albums
1987 live albums
Sugar Hill Records live albums